Tetraopes crinitus is a species of beetle in the family Cerambycidae. It was described by Chemsak and Noguera in 2004. It is known from Mexico.

References

Tetraopini
Beetles described in 2004